"" (German for "Lick me in the arse") is a canon in B-flat major composed by Wolfgang Amadeus Mozart, K. 231 (K. 382c), with lyrics in German. It was one of a set of at least six canons probably written in Vienna in 1782. Sung by six voices as a three-part round, it is thought to be a party piece for his friends.

English translation
The German idiom used as the title of the work is equivalent to the English "Kiss my arse!" or American "Kiss my ass!" However, the literal translation of the title is "Lick me in the arse".

Publication and modern discovery
Mozart died in 1791 and his widow, Constanze Mozart, sent the manuscripts of the canons to publishers Breitkopf & Härtel in 1799 saying that they would need to be adapted for publication. The publisher changed the title and lyrics of this canon to the more acceptable "" ("Let us be glad!"). Of Mozart's original text, only the first words were documented in the catalogue of his works produced by Breitkopf & Härtel.

A new text version, which may have been the authentic one, came to light in 1991. Handwritten texts to this and several other similar canons were found added to a printed score of the work in an historical printed edition acquired by Harvard University's Music Library. They had evidently been added to the book by a later hand. However, since in six of the pieces these entries matched texts that had, in the meantime, independently come to light in original manuscripts, it was hypothesised that the remaining three may, too, have been original, including texts for K. 231 ("Leck mich im Arsch" itself), and another Mozart work, "Leck mir den Arsch fein recht schön sauber" ("Lick my arse nice and clean", K. 233; K. 382d in the revised numbering). Later research revealed that the latter work was likely composed by Wenzel Trnka.

Lyrics
The text rediscovered in 1991 consists only of the repeated phrases:

where "A..." obviously stands for "Arsch"; "g'schwindi" is a dialect word derived from "geschwind", meaning "quickly".

The bowdlerised text of the early printed editions reads:

Another semi-bowdlerized adaptation is found in the recordings of The Complete Mozart edition by Brilliant Classics:

This is a clear allusion to the line "... er kann mich im Arsche lecken!" (literally, "he can lick me in the ass" or idiomatically "he can kiss my ass") attributed to the late medieval German knight Götz von Berlichingen, known best as the title hero of Johann Wolfgang von Goethe's 1773 drama. The text of the canon contains a slight error about the Goethe source: the line occurs in the third act.

See also
"Difficile lectu" – a canon with a disguised Latin version of the same text
"Bona nox" – "Good night", a multilingual scatological canon
Mozart and scatology

Notes

Further reading
Zaslaw, Neal (2006) "The Non-Canonic Status of Mozart's Canons", Eighteenth-Century Music (2006), 3: 109–123 Cambridge University Press.

External links

Canons by Wolfgang Amadeus Mozart
1782 compositions
Compositions in B-flat major
German profanity
German-language songs
Off-color humor
Humor in classical music